El Molar is a municipality in the comarca of Priorat, Tarragona Province, Catalonia, Spain.

Most of the local economy is based on vineyards, as well as almond and olive tree plantations.

History
Remnants of two ancient villages, the oldest from the 6th or 7th century, are within the El Molar municipal term.

The present village dates from the 13th century after the area had been reconquered from the saracens. During medieval times the town was part of the Barony of Entença. According to an 1156 document by which Ramon Berenguer IV ceded the territory to the Poblet Monastery, El Molar was linked to neighboring Garcia town. This situation ended in the 19th century.

El Molar was bombed by Condor Legion planes during the Spanish Civil War. An abandoned galena mine nearby was used as a field hospital during the Battle of the Ebro.

Monuments
The 18th-century local church is dedicated to Saint Roch (Sant Roc).

References

 Joan Asens, Guia del Priorat, Tarragona, Edicions de la Llibreria La Rambla, 1981.
Jordi Tomàs Bonell, Descubrir Catalunya, poble a poble, Premsa Catalana, Barcelona, 1994

External links

 El Molar Town Hall webpage
 Government data pages 

Municipalities in Priorat
Populated places in Priorat